K's Choice is a Belgian rock band from Antwerp, formed in the mid-1990s. The band's core members are brothers Sam Bettens (lead vocals, guitar) and Gert Bettens (guitar, keyboard, vocals). They are joined by Bart Van Lierde (bass), Tom Lodewyckx (lead guitar), Reinout Swinnen (keys) and Wim Van Der Westen (drums).  The band has produced gold and platinum albums.

Band history
In the early 1990s, Sam and Gert played in an amateur band, The Basement Plugs.  This led to the discovery of Sam, who was offered a chance by a label; mainly because of his smoky, enigmatic voice.  Under the name Sarah Beth, he appeared on several movie soundtracks with covers including "I'm So Lonesome I Could Cry" (originally by Hank Williams) for the movie Vrouwen Willen Trouwen (Women Want To Marry) and a duet with Frankie Miller, "Why Don't You Try Me", (originally by Ry Cooder) for the movie Ad Fundum.  He was offered a contract and formed a band with his brother Gert. The band was named The Choice and in 1994 they recorded their debut album The Great Subconscious Club.

In 1993, the band had five more or less permanent members: Sam and Gert Bettens, Jan van Sichem, Jr. (guitar), Bart Van Der Zeeuw (drums) and Erik Verheyden (bass).  These five toured Germany and the United States in support of the Indigo Girls.  When they learned of another group in the U.S. named The Choice, they changed their name to avoid legal problems; they decided upon "K's Choice" by going through the alphabet to see which letter would sound best in front of the word choice.  Since they thought they needed a story behind the new name, they previously claimed that the K referred to Joseph K. from Kafka's the Trial, but later the band revealed the arbitrariness of choosing the "K".

Paradise in Me & Not An Addict 
In 1995, they released Paradise in Me. "Not an Addict", the first single taken from this album, was successful and brought international fame. This single was their most popular hit. For the next year (1996–1997) they toured supporting Alanis Morissette, who heard the band playing on a European festival and handpicked them as her support band.

Cocoon Crash & Almost Happy 
In 1998,  Cocoon Crash, their third album was done.  Meanwhile, American Eric Grossman had become the permanent bass player. In 1999, the band appeared on Buffy the Vampire Slayer in the episode "Doppelgängland" performing their song "Virgin State Of Mind". The song appeared on the soundtrack Buffy the Vampire Slayer: The Album. It was at this point that their drummer Bart van der Zeeuw had been replaced by Koen Lieckens. In 2000, their next studio album Almost Happy was finished and released in Europe in September.

In 2001, Live (a 2-CD collection of live recordings) was in stores in Europe while Almost Happy was released in the US with another cover and a second CD of some songs from Live. In 2003, Ten (a collection of ten years of singles and songs that did not appear on their albums, plus the brand new single "Losing You") was released, accompanied by a DVD bearing the same name.

In October 2002, the band decided to go on a sabbatical.  Gert and Sam both wanted to try out some solo work.  Gert produced an album for a Belgian band, Venus in Flames, and Sam recorded a solo mini-CD Go and appeared on several movie soundtracks with songs of his own ("All of This Past" for Underworld and "Someone to Say Hi To" for Zus and Zo).
In addition to four full albums, a live album, and a best-of, they also produced four limited edition and fan club CDs: Extra Cocoon, 2000 Seconds Live, Home and Running Backwards.

More solo projects 
In 2005, Sam released his solo album Scream in both Europe and the U.S., accompanied by a tour. Gert, having flirted for a while with the band name Moon Brigade, announced his new band is called "Woodface" (which is also the name of one of his favorite albums from Crowded House). Woodface released its first album Good Morning Hope on 19 September 2005. Sam released another solo album called Shine and Gert another Woodface Album Comet in 2007. In 2008, Sam released another album, Never Say Goodbye. Gert and his band Woodface opened at several of Sam's shows in 2007 and 2008.

In an 7 October 2008, interview with Austin Sound Check, Sam confirmed plans for a new album in 2009. On 8 June 2009, six years after K's Choice announced their indefinite hiatus, the band's official website announced they will perform at the 35th edition of Folk Dranouter on 7 August 2009. In 2009, to celebrate the return of K's Choice on the international level, Sony Music released the compilation album The Essential K's Choice.

Return with Echo Mountain 
K's Choice recorded their fifth studio album Echo Mountain in the Echo Mountain Studios in Asheville, North Carolina. On 22 February 2010, they confirmed on their website that the new album will be released on 26 March 2010. "When I Lay Beside You" and "Come Live The Life" were released as singles.
In 2011, Sam and Gert recorded a follow-up to Echo Mountain in the form of an acoustic CD called Little Echoes. For this album and the following tour, the both of them were only joined by pianist Reinout Swinnen.

In 2013, Sam and Gert returned to Echo Mountain Studios to record an album as a side project under the name "Bettens" for a 3D documentary about an expedition to Antarctica, Beyond the Challenge. The album titled, Waving at the Sun was eventually released under the K's Choice name in the U.S. and other countries in 2014.

Private Revolution 
On 6 February 2015, K's Choice released the first single "Private Revolution" of their latest studio album The Phantom Cowboy. A teaser video for "Private Revolution" was released to YouTube on 5 February 2015. The video features concert and prior video footage of Sam and Gert. A video for the track "Bag of Concrete" was released on 12 June 2015. The album was released on 5 February 2015 in much of Europe by Wallaby Records, LLC and distributed by Sony, and on 18 September 2015 in the US, UK, Canada, and Ireland by MPress Records. In September 2015 the band released "Perfect Scar" as a single and video. The album was a Top 3 hit in Belgium. 

In March 2016, K's Choice embarked on their first US tour in a decade in support of The Phantom Cowboy with longtime friends and, more recently, labelmates A Fragile Tomorrow.

The Backpack Sessions, Liefde Voor Muziek & 30th Anniversary 
In late 2016 the band released The Backpack Sessions, as a companion album to the tour of the same name. It featured acoustic re-workings of songs from albums like The Great Subconscious Club, Cocoon Crash and The Phantom Cowboy. The album also featured cover versions of Aretha Franklin's "(You Make Me Feel Like A) Natural Woman" and Justin Bieber's "Love Yourself".

In January 2017, the band released a stripped-back re-recording of "Not an Addict." It featured Skin of Skunk Anansie as a guest vocalist, who had previously performed the song live with the group on several occasions. 

On 24 March 2017, the band released an album entitled 25 as a retrospective of their 25 years as a group. The album included new song "Resonate" and the "Not an Addict" version featuring Skin that was previously released. The album went to #4 on The Belgian album charts. 

On 16 March 2018, the band released a concert album entitled Live at the Ancienne Belgique, a double live album recorded in Brussels on 13 December 2017 during the 25th Anniversary tour.

In 2018 Sam and Gert participated in the popular Belgian TV show Liefde Voor Muziek, in which they performed songs by Jasper Steverlinck, Within Temptation and Helmut Lotti a.o. Belgian singer Niels Destadsbader sang K's Choice's Believe in the show, re-worked to Verover Mij, which became Top 5 hit. At the same time the album Love = Music was released, featuring all Liefde Voor Muziek covers. The album was a Top 10 hit.  

In December 2022 the band announced a 30th Anniversary Tour, a vinyl box-set and a brand new single Time Is A Parasite which was pronounced Catch Of The Day on Studio Brussel on the day of release.

Music
Their music can be described as guitar-based singer-songwriter rock or folk-rock. It ranges from very delicate and intimate singer-songwriter songs to songs that are stronger, more active, and louder. Sam's smoky, enigmatic voice is the band's best known characteristic. In the seven years between The Great Subconscious Club and Almost Happy the music changed from raw and guitar-based to a more subtle and delicate sound. Sam and Gert write all of the music and lyrics. Most of it is written separately. Sam mainly tries to express ideas in his songs, and has a hand in writing silly and tongue-in-cheek songs. Gert has one big theme: losing the one you love. While most of the songs are easily accessible and open, some others are strange and incomprehensible. This led Gert to comment regarding their song "Virgin State of Mind": "Listening to the lyrics for the first time, you may find it hard to understand their meaning. When you listen to them a second time, however, you may sense a basic truth in these cryptic words. If you do so, please let me know."

Members

Current members
Sam Bettens – lead vocals, guitar (1994–2003, 2009–present)
Gert Bettens – rhythm guitar, keyboards, backing vocals (1994–2003, 2009–present)
Reinout Swinnen – keyboards (2009–present)
Bart Van Lierde – bass (2014–present)
Tom Lodewyckx – lead guitar (2014–present)
Wim Van Der Westen – drums (2014–present)

Former members
Erik Verheyden – bass (1994–1997)
Bart Van Der Zeeuw – drums, backing vocals (1994–1999)
Jan van Sichem, Jr. – lead guitar (1994–1997, 1999–2003)
Eric Grossman – bass (1997–2003, 2009–2014)
Koen Lieckens – drums (1999–2003, 2009–2014)
Thomas Vanelslander – lead guitar (2009–2014)

Discography

Studio albums
The Great Subconscious Club (1994)
Paradise in Me (1996)
Cocoon Crash (1998)
Almost Happy (2000)
Echo Mountain (2010)
The Phantom Cowboy (2015)
Love = Music (2018)

Compilation and concert albums and fan club-only CDs
Extra Cocoon (1998)
2000 Seconds Live (1998) (fanclub only)
Live (2001)
Home (2001) (fanclub only)
Running Backwards (2003) (fanclub only)
10: 1993-2003 - Ten Years Of (2003)
The Essential K's Choice (2009)
Little Echoes (2011) (acoustic album)
Waving at the Sun (2013) (under the name "Bettens")
The Backpack Sessions (2016) (acoustic album)
25 (2017)
Live at the Ancienne Belgique (2018)

Singles

References

External links

 
Woodface, Gert's new band
Interview with Gert Bettens about K's Choice's hiatus and Echo Mountain. On Jekyll and Hyde, 106FM Jerusalem, Israel
K's Choice – Now Is Mine Live in Israel 23.1.2012

Belgian alternative rock groups
Belgian pop music groups
Musical groups established in 1994
Musical groups disestablished in 2003
Musical groups reestablished in 2009
1994 establishments in Belgium